Siru is an earthenware steamer used to steam grain or grain flour dishes such as tteok (rice cakes).

Gallery

See also 
 List of cooking vessels
 Bamboo steamer
 Siru-tteok

References 

Korean cuisine
Korean food preparation utensils
Cooking appliances
Cooking vessels